Alternate U.S. Route 72 (US 72 Alt.) exists in Alabama on the south side of the Tennessee River between Muscle Shoals and Decatur, while US 72 follows on the north side of the river between Florence and Athens. US 72A crosses the Tennessee River at Decatur, along with U.S. Highway 31, and follows the entire route of Interstate 565. SR-20 was co-signed with US 72A from Muscle Shoals to Huntsville but has since been truncated to the junction of I-65 just east of Decatur.

Originally, US 72A turned off SR-20 on to SR-53 / Jordan Lane in Huntsville and followed it north  to rejoin with US 72. With the completion of I-565 in the early 1990s, US 72A was routed along with I-565 to the termination of I-565 at US 72 at Chapman Mountain.

Route description
US 72 Alt. begins at an intersection with US 43/US 72 in Muscle Shoals. Here, this road continues west as part of US 72. East of there, it intersects SR 157 at an at-grade intersection, where a concurrency begins.

A couple miles east of there, the roads split. SR 157 heads straight towards Moulton. US 72 Alt. turns due east at the interchange, heading towards Town Creek and Decatur. 

US 72 Alt. enters Decatur after passing through Trinity, carrying SR 20. It serves as the northern terminus for The Beltline (SR 67) and continues eastward towards the town center. After traveling by the Old State Bank and the Dancy Polk House in the downtown area, US 72 Alt. intersects US 31. It continues over the "Steamboat Bill" Hudson Memorial Bridge, after which it and SR 20 continue east towards I-65 and I-565, while US 31 continues north towards Athens and Calhoun Community College.

After the interchange at I-65, US 72A becomes concurrent with I-565. The two routes run together for the entire length of I-565, passing through Mooresville, Madison, and Huntsville passing through intersections such as the University Drive and the elevated stretch. East of Downtown Huntsville, the routes ascend Chapman Mountain, where they intersect US 72, which serves as the eastern terminus for both I-565 and US 72A.

Major intersections

See also

References

72 Alternate
72 Alternate
Huntsville-Decatur, AL Combined Statistical Area
Decatur metropolitan area, Alabama
072 Alternate
Alternate
Transportation in Colbert County, Alabama
Transportation in Lawrence County, Alabama
Transportation in Morgan County, Alabama
Transportation in Limestone County, Alabama
Transportation in Madison County, Alabama